The Royal London Circus is a famous travelling circus show based in Danga Bay, Johor in Malaysia. The Royal London Circus has performed in the country since 1990. The circus is now officially under receivership and owes a lot of money to creditors. 

Circuses
Malaysian culture